Seamus M. Lynch (born 2002) is an Irish cricketer.

Born at Dublin, Lynch is a product of Terenure Cricket Club. He has played for Ireland at under-17 level and was added to the Cricket Ireland Academy. In the restructuring of Irish domestic cricket prior to the 2021 season, Lynch was assigned to the Cork based Munster Reds squad. He made his debut for the Reds in a List A one-day match against North West Warriors at Eglinton, with his Twenty20 debut coming later in the season against Leinster Lightning at Dublin in the first Interprovincial T20 festival of the season.

References

External links

2003 births
Living people
Cricketers from Dublin (city)
Irish cricketers
Munster Reds cricketers